20 Aquarii, abbreviated 20 Aqr, is a star in the constellation Aquarius. 20 Aquarii is the Flamsteed designation. It is a dim star with an apparent visual magnitude of 6.38. The star is predicted to come to within  in around 1.9 million years.

This is an F-type main-sequence star with a stellar classification of F0 V. (Cowley and Fraquelli [1974] had given it a class of F0 III.) It is a suspected chemically peculiar Am star showing metallic lines. It is 761 million years old with a high projected rotational velocity of 92 km/s. The star has 1.52 times the mass of the Sun and is radiating 9 times the Sun's luminosity from its photosphere at an effective temperature of about 7,314 K.

References

F-type main-sequence stars
Aquarius (constellation)
Durchmusterung objects
Aquarii, 020
203843
105729
8192

zh:天鷹座20